"Biting My Tongue" is a song by Australian pop duo The Veronicas, released as a single on 3 July 2020 through Sony Music Australia as the lead single from their fifth studio album Human (2021).

Background
The release of "Biting My Tongue" was announced by The Veronicas in late June 2020 along with the title of their fifth studio album Human. On the single's release date, they also uploaded a preview for the song's music video.

Jessica Origliasso described the song as "really about saying 'I need to declare my undying love for you. No regrets." with Lisa Origliasso adding:

Music video
"Biting My Tongue" marked the directorial debut for The Veronicas. The music video features twins Bud and Aidan Brennan Williams. The video was released on July 21, 2020.

Critical reception
Rolling Stone described "Biting My Tongue" as an "exuberant pop anthem which captures the pair at their absolute best".

Track listing
Digital download
 "Biting My Tongue" – 3:06

Charts

References

2020 songs
The Veronicas songs